Mahmoud Abbaszadeh Meshkini is an Iranian politician.

Abbaszadeh Meshkini was born in Meshginshahr, Ardabil Province. In 2012 he became Governor of Ilam Province in the Ahmadi Nejad Government, as well as general manager of
political Ministry of Interior.

References

People from Meshginshahr
Living people
Iranian governors
Year of birth missing (living people)